Nabaruh is a city in Egypt, located in the governorate of Dakahlia. In 2006, it had a population of 38,953.

References 

Cities in Egypt
Populated places in Dakahlia Governorate